The annexation of Santo Domingo was an attempted treaty during the later Reconstruction era, initiated by United States President Ulysses S. Grant in 1869, to annex "Santo Domingo" (as the Dominican Republic was commonly known) as a United States territory, with the promise of eventual statehood. President Grant feared some European power would take the island country in violation of the Monroe Doctrine. He privately thought annexation would be a safety valve for African Americans who were suffering persecution in the U.S., but he did not include this in his official messages. Grant speculated that the acquisition of Santo Domingo would help bring about the end of slavery in Cuba and elsewhere.

In 1869, Grant commissioned his private secretary Orville E. Babcock and Rufus Ingalls to negotiate the treaty of annexation with Dominican president Buenaventura Báez. The annexation process drew controversy: opponents Senator Charles Sumner and Senator Carl Schurz denounced the treaty vehemently, alleging it was made only to enrich private American and island interests and to politically protect Báez. Grant had authorized the U.S. Navy to protect the Dominican Republic from invasion by neighboring Haiti while the treaty annexation process took place in the U.S. Senate. A plebiscite ordered by Báez, who believed the Dominican Republic had better odds of survival as a U.S. protectorate and could sell a much wider range of goods to the U.S. than could be sold in European markets, registered an improbably low 11 votes against annexation, compared to over ten thousand for annexation. The country's unstable history was one of invasion, colonization, and civil strife.

A treaty was drafted by Secretary of State Hamilton Fish that included the annexation of the country itself and the purchase of Samaná Bay for two million American dollars. Also included and supported by Grant was the provision that the Dominican Republic could apply for statehood. When debated in the Senate, Sumner staunchly opposed the treaty, believing the annexation process was corrupt and that the Dominican Republic was politically unstable, having a history of revolution. Sumner believed that Báez was a corrupt despot and that the use of the U.S. Navy by Grant during the treaty negotiation to protect Santo Domingo was illegal. Sumner said that the annexationists wanted the whole island and would also absorb the independent black nation of Haiti. Schurz opposed acquisition because he did not favor mixed-race people becoming U.S. citizens. The treaty ultimately failed to reach the two-thirds vote needed (the vote was a tie). In order to vindicate the failed treaty annexation, Grant sent a committee, authorized by Congress and including African American Frederick Douglass, that investigated and produced a report favorable to annexation of the Dominican Republic into the United States.

The annexation treaty failed because there was little support for it outside Grant's circle. The defeat of the treaty in the Senate directly contributed to the division of the Republican party into two opposing factions during the presidential election of 1872: the Radical Republicans (composed of Grant and his loyalists) and the Liberal Republicans (composed of Schurz, Sumner, Horace Greeley as presidential candidate, and other opponents of Grant).

Annexation proposal

In 1867, during President Andrew Johnson's administration, the Dominican government, under threat of Haitian invasion, had asked to be annexed by the United States. However, Congress was unwilling to comply to any proposal made by Johnson.

In April 1869, Joseph W. Fabens, a New England businessman representing the Dominican Republic, asked Secretary of State Hamilton Fish that the Dominican Republic, then known as Santo Domingo, be annexed to the United States and able to apply for statehood. Grant, initially, did not have any interest in annexation. However, when Grant learned that the U.S. Navy had an interest in acquiring Samaná Bay as a coaling station, he became interested.

Fish appointed Benjamin P. Hunt with diplomatic authority to look into the Dominican Republic's debt and whether the people actually desired to join the United States. Hunt, however, fell ill and could not make the journey. Grant then sent his aide, Brevet Brigadier General Orville E. Babcock, to gather information on the Dominican Republic. Rather than official diplomatic authority, Grant personally gave Babcock special agent status with a personal introduction letter for Dominican President Buenaventura Báez.

In addition to the coaling station, President Grant viewed that the Dominican Republic had immense resources and would give thousands of jobs to emigrant African American laborers, in addition to benefiting exports from Northern farms and manufacturers. Grant privately speculated that U.S. control would help compel Brazil, Puerto Rico, and Cuba to abolish slavery. Grant also speculated that if African Americans from the Southeastern United States had the option of emigration to the island, violent European American supremacist groups in the South, such as the Ku Klux Klan, would have to curb their use of violence against African Americans or lose their cheaper labor. Grant, however, was cautious in directly advocating African American emigration to the Dominican Republic. Fearing Britain might take control, Grant also mentioned the need to maintain the Monroe Doctrine.

Annexation treaty created
In September 1869, Babcock returned to Washington with a draft treaty of annexation. Grant's cabinet was stunned, not knowing that Babcock had planned to draw up an annexation treaty. Grant presented Babcock's informal treaty for his Cabinet to read, however, no Cabinet member offered any discussion on the treaty. Grant then asked Fish to draw up a formal diplomatic treaty, since Babcock did not have diplomatic authority. Having not been consulted on the Dominican treaty process, Fish was ready to resign from the Cabinet, however, Grant intervened having told Fish he would have complete control of the State Department, except for the Dominican Republic annexation treaty. Fish and Grant privately agreed that Fish would remain on the Cabinet and support Dominican annexation while Grant would not support Cuban belligerence during the Ten Years' War. On October 19, 1869, Fish drew up a formal treaty; the United States would annex the Dominican Republic, pay $1,500,000 on the Dominican national debt, offer the Dominican Republic the right to U.S. statehood, and the U.S. would rent Samaná Bay at $150,000 per annum for 50 years. According to Grant's biographer, Jean Edward Smith, Grant initially erred by not gaining U.S. public support and by keeping the treaty process secret from the U.S. Senate.

Grant visited Sumner

On January 2, 1870, prior to the formal treaty being submitted to the Senate, Grant made an unprecedented visit to Senator Charles Sumner at his home in Washington, D.C. Grant specifically informed Sumner of the Dominican Republic annexation treaty hoping for Sumner's support. Sumner was the powerful Chairman of the Senate Foreign Relations Committee and his support for the Dominican Republic treaty was crucial for passage in the Senate. The dialogue between the two men has been the subject of debate and controversy since the meeting. Different sources vary as to what exactly Sumner had said, however, Grant optimistically had walked away having believed Sumner had supported his treaty. Sumner stated that he only told Grant that he was a "Republican and an Administration man".

Treaty submitted and failure
On January 10, 1870, Grant formally submitted Fish's Dominican Republic annexation treaty to the U.S. Senate. The treaty was stalled in the Senate until Sumner's Foreign Relations Committee started hearings in mid February, 1870. Fish noted that the Senate was reluctant to pass any measures initiated by the executive branch. There was widespread opposition in the Senate to absorbing a nation with so many black and mixed-race inhabitants.

Sumner allowed the treaty to be debated openly on the Committee without giving his own opinion. However, on March 15, Sumner's Foreign Relations Committee in a closed session voted to oppose the treaty 5 to 2. On March 24, in another closed session, Sumner came out strongly against the treaty. Sumner opposed the treaty believing annexation would be expensive, launch an American empire in the Caribbean, and would diminish independent Hispanic and African creole republics in the Western Hemisphere. Grant met with many senators on Capitol Hill hoping to rally support for the Treaty, to no avail. Grant refused the suggestion that the treaty drop the Dominican statehood clause. 

Finally on the evening of June 30, 1870, the Senate defeated the Dominican Republic annexation treaty by a vote of 28 to 28. Eighteen Republican senators joined Sumner to defeat the Dominican annexation treaty.

Aftermath and repercussions
Grant was livid at the treaty's failure to pass the Senate and blamed Sumner's opposition for the defeat; Grant had believed Sumner had originally agreed to support the treaty at their January 2, 1870, meeting. Grant then retaliated by firing U.S. Ambassador to Britain, John Lothrop Motley, Sumner's close friend. Then in March 1871, Grant having influence in the Senate got his allied senators to remove Sumner as chairman of the Senate Foreign Relations Committee. Grant was able to get Congress to allow an investigation Commission to be sent and make an objective assessment as to whether annexation would be beneficial to both the United States and the Dominican Republic. The Commission, sent in 1871, included civil rights activist Frederick Douglass and reported favorably on the annexation of the Dominican Republic to the United States. The Commission, however, failed to generate enough enthusiasm in the Senate to overcome opposition to Dominican Republic annexation. As the aforementioned local plebiscite on annexation only involved 30% of the Dominican electorate, the whole affair may have failed to adequately account for the wishes of the population regarding annexation versus continued independence.

See also
 Dominican Republic–United States relations
 Ostend Manifesto

References

Citations

Works cited

Further reading
 Atkins, G. Pope and Larman Wilson. The Dominican Republic and the United States: From Imperialism to Transnationalism (University of Georgia Press, 1998)
 Donald, David Herbert.  Charles Sumner and the Rights of Man (1970) 
 Nelson, William Javier. Almost a territory: America's attempt to annex the Dominican Republic (University of Delaware Press, 1990)
 Nevins, Allam. Hamilton Fish;: The inner history of the Grant administration (1936) pp 249–78 
 Polyné, Millery. "Expansion Now!: Haiti," Santo Domingo," and Frederick Douglass at the Intersection of US and Caribbean Pan-Americanism." Caribbean Studies 34.2 (2006): 3-45. online free
 Tansill, Charles Callan. The United States and Santo Domingo, 1798-1873: A Chapter in Caribbean Diplomacy (1938) the standard scholarly history 
 Tavárez, Fidel. "'The Moral Miasma of the Tropics': American Imperialism and the Failed Annexation of the Dominican Republic, 1869-1871." Nuevo Mundo Mundos Nuevos. Nouveaux mondes mondes nouveaux-Novo Mundo Mundos Novos-New world New worlds (2011).

External links
 May 31, 1870: Message Regarding Dominican Republic Annexation transcript, Miller Center of Public Affairs

History of the Dominican Republic
Second Dominican Republic
Presidency of Ulysses S. Grant
Proposed treaties
1869 in the United States
1870 in the United States
Dominican Republic–United States relations
History of United States expansionism
Annexation
Proposed states and territories of the United States
Settlement schemes in Central America and the Caribbean
American colonization movement